Kuo (Koh) is an Mbum language of northern Cameroon and southern Chad.

Distribution
Kuo, like Kali, is spoken in scattered areas of the eastern part of Vina department (Mbe and eastern Ngaoundéré communes) and in Mbere department (Meiganga commune) in the Adamawa Region. In the Eastern Region, it is spoken in the northern part of Lom-et-Djerem department (Garoua-Boulaï and Bétaré-Oya communes). It is spoken by 2,975 people.

References

Languages of Chad
Languages of Cameroon
Mbum languages